Terry Hecker (born 6 January 1970) is a former Australian rules footballer who played with Collingwood in the Victorian Football League (VFL).

Hecker made his VFL debut in Collingwood's round 18 win over the West Coast Eagles in 1989. He kept his place in the team for the elimination final but then didn't play a senior game until 1992, when he made four appearances early in the season.

References

1970 births
Australian rules footballers from Victoria (Australia)
Collingwood Football Club players
Lalor Football Club players
Living people